The 1936 United States presidential election in North Dakota took place on November 3, 1936, as part of the 1936 United States presidential election. Voters chose four representatives, or electors to the Electoral College, who voted for president and vice president.

Background
Ever since statehood, North Dakota had been overwhelmingly Republican at state level and in many presidential elections, although progressive Democrat Woodrow Wilson was able to carry the state in both his campaigns in 1912 and 1916, in the second due to his anti-war platform. In the following three elections, the state's voting would be shaped by its extreme isolationism in the aftermath of President Wilson's pushing of the nation into World War I and his “League of Nations” proposal, to which the Russian-Germans who dominated North Dakota's populace were vehemently opposed. The Peace Garden State thus shifted markedly from voting four-to-one for Warren G. Harding against the pro-League James M. Cox in 1920, to being the second-strongest state for Robert La Follette under the Nonpartisan League banner in 1924, to strong pro-Catholic and anti-Prohibition voting for Al Smith in 1928. Severe drought and depression in the following three years turned the state overwhelmingly to Franklin D. Roosevelt in 1932, despite President Hoover's call to “be safe” by supporting him, and at the same time North Dakota elected progressive, pro-New Deal Republicans to fill its House and Senate seats. One of these, Gerald Nye, would say in 1934 that the GOP needed to

Local third-party candidacy
Controversial Louisiana Governor and Senator Huey P. Long had planned to run against incumbent Roosevelt on an economically more radical platform in the 1936 election, but was assassinated in September 1935. The ashes of Long's movement were taken over by “radio priest” Father Charles Coughlin, who nominated local Representative William Lemke as the presidential candidate of the new “Union Party” on June 9, whose platform was vague and clearly Coughlin's personal creation. Lemke had had a long history as a progressive reformer since endorsing Woodrow Wilson in 1912.

Vote
Lemke was a poor campaigner and speaker, and unable to build his hoped-for “consensus of despair” amongst agrarian radicals, southern poor whites, Catholics and the elderly. The “favorite son” effect and the state's extreme isolationism meant Lemke received 13.41 percent of his home state's vote – over four and a half times the 2.88 percent of on-ballot votes he won nationally. Lemke exceeded 28 percent in the counties of Burke, Sheridan and Hettinger, and ran second ahead of Republican nominee Alf Landon in six counties. However, he did not make the impact personally expected when nominated, and unlike elsewhere in the nation, Lemke's best vote was not where ethnic and religious influences might have been expected to give him the largest vote, but in the northwest where local leaders held votes for him. Nonetheless, only Ross Perot in 1992 and Evan McMullin in 2016 have since equalled Lemke's performance for a third-party candidate in any non-southern county.

Roosevelt won North Dakota by a margin of 33.02 percentage points and for the second consecutive election carried every county in the state. , this is the last time that a Democratic presidential candidate has carried every county in the state, as well as the last time one has carried the following counties: Golden Valley, Grant, Kidder, Logan, McIntosh, Mercer and Sheridan.This is also the most votes a Democrat has ever received in North Dakota in a presidential election.

Results

Results by county

See also
 United States presidential elections in North Dakota

Notes

References

North Dakota
1936
1936 North Dakota elections